Maigret and the Toy Village (other English-language title is Félicie) is a detective novel by Belgian writer Georges Simenon, featuring his character inspector Jules Maigret.

Translations
The book has been translated two times into English: in 1978 as Maigret and the Toy Village by Eileen Ellenbogen and in 2015 as Félicie by David Coward.

Adaptations
The novel has been adapted several times for cinema and television:

In French
1968: as Félicie est là, with Jean Richard in the lead role;
2002: as La Maison de Félicie, with Bruno Cremer;

In English
1962: as Love from Felicie, with Rupert Davies;
1993: as Maigret and the Maid with Michael Gambon

In Japanese
1978: as Keishi to gārufurendo (警視とガールフレンド), with Kinya Aikawa in Maigret's role;

In Dutch
1968: as Maigret en het meisje voor dag en nacht, with Jan Teulings.

Literature
Maurice Piron, Michel Lemoine, L'Univers de Simenon, guide des romans et nouvelles (1931-1972) de Georges Simenon, Presses de la Cité, 1983, p. 302-303

External links

Maigret at trussel.com

References

1944 Belgian novels
Maigret novels
Novels set in France
Novels set in the 20th century